Michael Marinkovic (born August 29, 1991) is a German footballer who is currently a free agent.

Career

Marinkovic began his professional career with SpVgg Unterhaching in 2012 and made his debut for the club in April 2013, as a substitute for Tobias Schweinsteiger in a 1–0 defeat to Rot-Weiss Erfurt in the 3. Liga. He was released by the club at the end of the 2013–14 season.

External links

1991 births
Living people
German footballers
SpVgg Unterhaching players
3. Liga players
Association football forwards